Heikant was a hamlet in the municipality of Cranendonck, in the Dutch province of North Brabant. It is now a part of the village of Gastel (also in the municipality of Cranendonck).

Populated places in North Brabant
Cranendonck